Lévon Minassian is a French-Armenian duduk player. He was born in Marseilles in the district of Saint-Jerome. 
He played for the soundtrack of Mayrig. He has collaborated with Charles Aznavour, Helene Segara, Peter Gabriel, Tony Levin, Armand Amar and Sting.

Discography

- Solo :

1998 : The Doudouk Beyond Borders Lévon Minassian and Friends 
2006 : Songs From a World Apart Lévon Minassian & Armand Amar
2016 : Sources Lévon Minassian

- Collaboration :

1992 : Us Peter Gabriel : Plays on Come Talk to Me, Blood of Eden and Fourteen Black Paintings.
1994 : Secret World Live - Peter Gabriel 
1995 : World Diary - Tony Levin : Plays on Mingled Roots & La Tristesse Amoureuse De La Nuit.
 2003 : Sacred Love -  Sting 
2008 : Big Blue Ball - Various Artists, Starring Peter Gabriel, Natacha Atlas, Sinéad O'Connor, Billy Cobham, Manu Katché, etc. - Plays on Forest.

- Movie scores :

1985 : Les mémoires tatouées - A film by Georges Garvarentz
1991 : Mayrig - A film by Henri Verneuil
1992 : 588 rue Paradis - Henri Verneuil
2002 : Amen - Costas Gavras
2002 : L'Odyssée de l'espèce - Yvan Cassar

Sources 
 Biography :  http://www.levonminassian.com/biographie
 Levon Sources : http://www.levonminassian.com/
 Henri Verneuil : https://www.imdb.com/name/nm0894577/
 La grande vie Film : http://www.allocine.fr/film/fichefilm-36119/casting/
 Amen Costa Gavras : http://www.levonminassian.com/projets/amen/

Awards
2003 Chevalier de l'Ordre des Arts et des Lettres. Or in english, Order of Arts and Letters.

External links

Biography

Living people
French people of Armenian descent
Dudukahars
Woodwind musicians
Year of birth missing (living people)